The 1905 Drexel Dragons football team did not have a head coach.

Schedule

Roster

References

Drexel
Drexel Dragons football seasons
Drexel Dragons football